Condylostylus inornatus is a species of long-legged fly in the family Dolichopodidae.

References

Sciapodinae
Articles created by Qbugbot
Insects described in 1901
Taxa named by John Merton Aldrich